Barro Negro is a scoria cone in the northern Puna of Argentina. The other northeastward is heavily eroded and only isolated lava plateaus are left.

The lavas erupted from the cone are porphyric trachyandesite-basalt of shoshonitic composition. They contain pyroxene and olivine phenocrysts with subordinate microphenocrysts of plagioclase and phlogopite and inclusions of gray minerals. The magmas generating this volcanism are primitive and may be oceanic crust-derived melts with some crustal contamination.

References 

Volcanoes of Argentina